Chersotis elegans is a moth of the family Noctuidae. It is found in the mountains of Spain, Greece, Turkey, the Caucasus, Lebanon, Israel and western central Asia.

Description
Warren (1914) states 
R. elegans Ev. (— grammiptera Bsd., cancellata Frr.) Forewing pale brown, the veins whitish: lines black and white; stigmata margined with white and black, the claviform large and pointed, the reniform angled inwards on median nervure; submarginal line white preceded by a row of black wedge-shaped marks: hindwing of male white with slight subterminal brownish band of female more or less suffused with fuscous. A South European species, found in Spain, France, Greece, and S. Russia; widely spread in W. Asia, and also in Siberia and Turkestan.

Subspecies
Chersotis elegans elegans
Chersotis elegans hermonis (Israel)

Biology
Adults are on wing from July to September. There is one generation per year.

References

External links
 Noctuinae of Israel
 GBIF
 academic

Noctuinae
Moths of Europe
Moths of Asia
Moths described in 1837